UABC Radio is a radio station in the state of Baja California, with transmitters in Ensenada, Mexicali and Tijuana. The station is owned by the Autonomous University of Baja California and broadcasts a cultural radio format.

History
Radio Universidad was created in 1976 to serve as UABC's radio service. UABC had been producing radio programs since 1964 when it began creating La Hora Universitaria Radiofónica but did not have a station of its own until April 8, 1976. A 250-watt transmitter carried the sounds of Beethoven's 5th Symphony to Mexicali that night. In 1978, the station was properly permitted with a power of 100,000 watts.

On February 23, 1987, Radio Universidad expanded to Ensenada on XHUAC-FM 95.5, and on February 24, 2000, XEUT-AM came to air in Tijuana. On 1630 kHz, XEUT was just the second AM expanded band station authorized in Mexico (behind XEUACH-AM, which launched in 1997).

In 2011, the system was relaunched under its current name and with a new administrative structure.

On October, 2022, UABC Radio ceased broadcast operations on its terrestrial stations, and moved the station's College Radio format (which was branded as "UABC para tus oídos") to online only.

Transmitters
UABC Radio has three stations:

References

External links 
UABC Radio Facebook
Official Website

XHUAC-FM
XHBA-FM
XEUT-AM
Spanish-language radio stations
University radio stations in Mexico